Anja-Nadin Pietrek (born 13 March 1979) was a German female volleyball player. She was part of the Germany women's national volleyball team.

She competed with the national team at the 2000 Summer Olympics in Sydney, Australia, finishing 6th.

See also
 Germany at the 2000 Summer Olympics

References

External links
 
http://www.berliner-zeitung.de/anja-nadin-pietrek-bestreitet-ihre-letzten-spiele-fuer-die-volley-cats-berlin-zu-viele-versprechen-16036986
http://www.berliner-kurier.de/ex--volley-katze--pietrek-gibt-in-palermo-eine-gute-figur-ab-ciao-bella-tedesca-anja-nadin-21772374
http://www.tagesspiegel.de/sport/anja-nadin-pietrek-1996-war-olympia-extrem-weit-weg/159954.html
http://www.smash-hamburg.de/nat-teams/hnt-f/hnt-f-pietrek.htm

1979 births
Living people
German women's volleyball players
Volleyball players from Berlin
Volleyball players at the 2000 Summer Olympics
Olympic volleyball players of Germany